Douglas East is a House of Keys constituency in Douglas, Isle of Man.  It elects 2 MHKs.

Since the 2021 local elections the constituency's area has been adopted for Douglas East (ward) which replaced most of Victoria and Derby wards. The ward elects 3 councilors to Douglas Borough Council.

MHKs and elections

External links
Constituency maps and general election results

Constituencies of the Isle of Man